Medina is an album by jazz vibraphonist Bobby Hutcherson. It was released in 1980 on Blue Note Records (LT 1086) featuring six tracks recorded on 11 August 1969. The CD reissue added five tracks (#7-11) recorded in 1968, previously released on vinyl in 1979, under the title Spiral.

Track listing
All compositions by Bobbie Hutcherson except as noted
 "Avis" – 6:44
 "Comes Spring" – 3:22
 "Dave's Chant" (Cowell) – 5:16
 "Orientale" (Cowell) – 5:53
 "Medina" (Chambers) – 10:57
 "Ungano" (Chambers) – 8:03

Bonus tracks on CD reissue:
"Ruth" (Chambers) – 7:52
 "The Wedding March" (Cowell) – 3:54
 "Poor People's March" (Land) – 6:18
 "Spiral" (Chambers) – 6:15
 "Visions" – 3:50

Personnel
Bobby Hutcherson – vibraphone, marimba
Harold Land – saxophone
Stanley Cowell – piano
Reggie Johnson – bass
Joe Chambers – drums

References 

1980 albums
Blue Note Records albums
Bobby Hutcherson albums
Post-bop albums
Albums produced by Francis Wolff
Albums produced by Duke Pearson
Albums recorded at Van Gelder Studio